Mark Gibbons (born December 12, 1950) is a former justice of the Supreme Court of Nevada. He was elected to the Nevada Supreme Court in 2002.  Gibbons attended the University of California at Irvine and earned his bachelor's degree in 1972.  He attended law school at Loyola University School of Law in Los Angeles and graduated in 1975. He served as chief justice of the Supreme Court of Nevada in 2008, 2014 and 2019. Before being elected to the Nevada Supreme Court he served on the Clark County District Court as presiding judge in 1998 and Chief Judge in 2001.

Gibbons earned a Bachelor of Arts degree from University of California, Irvine and he received his Juris Doctor from Loyola Law School.

Gibbons is the brother of judge Michael P. Gibbons, currently serving on the Nevada Court of Appeals. The Commission on Judicial Ethics ruled that Justice Gibbons could preside over appeals heard by his brother.

References

|-

|-

|-

1950 births
Living people
21st-century American judges
Chief Justices of the Nevada Supreme Court
Justices of the Nevada Supreme Court
Loyola Law School alumni
University of California, Irvine alumni